Manoel Messias Barbosa da Silva, better known as Maranhão (born 25 December 1985) is a Brazilian footballer from Maranhão who plays as a right back for Boa Esporte.

Honors
Santos
São Paulo State League: 2012
Copa do Brasil: 2010

Coritiba
Paraná State League: 2011

References

External links

Living people
1985 births
Guarani FC players
Santos FC players
Coritiba Foot Ball Club players
Club Athletico Paranaense players
Clube Náutico Capibaribe players
Boa Esporte Clube players
Brazilian footballers
Campeonato Brasileiro Série A players
Campeonato Brasileiro Série B players
Palmas Futebol e Regatas players
Association football fullbacks
Sportspeople from Maranhão